The Faculty of English is a constituent part of the University of Cambridge. It was founded in 1914 as a Tripos within the Faculty of Medieval and Modern Languages. It could be studied only as a 'Part I' of a degree course, alongside a 'Part II' either in medieval languages or from another Tripos. In 1926, the course became a distinct Faculty.

The undergraduate degree course of 'Cambridge English', as well as the Faculty as a whole, is known for its distinctive focus on close reading (called Practical criticism), first championed by I. A. Richards and then later by William Empson and F. R. Leavis. Since the course was founded in 1926, Practical Criticism, Tragedy and Shakespeare have been mandatory parts of the course; the English Moralists paper (now renamed the Ethical Imagination) has also remained as an optional paper.

In the present day, its research focus is wide ranging: from Old English literature through to contemporary, and also associated themes such as digital humanities and the history of the book. One of its sub-divisions is the Department of Anglo-Saxon, Norse and Celtic, the only department in the world dedicated to the Early Middle Ages.

Notable staff
The faculty's senior teaching posts include a number of named professorships:

 Elrington and Bosworth Professor of Anglo-Saxon (currently Rosalind Love)
 King Edward VII Professor of English Literature (currently Clair Wills)
 Professor of Medieval and Renaissance English (Cambridge) (currently Nicolette Zeeman)
 Grace 2 Professor of English (currently Steven Connor)

Other notable current academics:

 Priyamvada Gopal, Professor of Postcolonial Studies
 John Kerrigan, Professor of English
 Robert Macfarlane, Reader in Literature and the Geohumanities

People associated with the Faculty

Academics and public intellectuals 

 Marshall McLuhan
 Arthur Quiller-Couch, the first holder of the King Edward VII Professorship
 F. R. Leavis
 C. S. Lewis
 M. C. Bradbrook
 Raymond Williams
 E. M. W. Tillyard
 Germaine Greer
 Eric Griffiths (critic)

Writers 

 J. H. Prynne
 Veronica Forrest-Thomson
 Sylvia Plath
 Ted Hughes
 Zadie Smith
 Peter Ackroyd
 Douglas Adams
 Howard Brenton
 Martin Crimp
 Emma Donoghue
 Margaret Drabble
 Sebastian Faulks
 Julian Fellowes

Actors 

 Sophie Winkleman
 Ian McKellen
 Miriam Margolyes

Politicians 

 Richard Burgon

References

Faculties in the School of Arts and Humanities, University of Cambridge